Cyril Barthe (born 14 February 1996) is a French cyclist, who currently rides for UCI ProTeam . In August 2019, he was named in the startlist for the 2019 Vuelta a España. In August 2020, he was named in the startlist for the 2020 Tour de France.

Major results
2017
 Volta a Portugal do Futuro
1st Stages 1 & 4
2018
 1st  Road race, National Under-23 Road Championships
 5th Overall Grande Prémio de Portugal N2
1st  Young rider classification
 10th Overall Troféu Joaquim Agostinho
1st Stage 2
2019
 9th Classica da Arrabida
 10th Circuito de Getxo
2021 
 9th Tour du Finistère
 9th Paris–Chauny
 9th Route Adélie
2022
 6th Tour du Finistère
2023
 10th Cholet-Pays de la Loire

Grand Tour general classification results timeline

References

External links

1996 births
Living people
French male cyclists
Sportspeople from Pyrénées-Atlantiques
Cyclists from Nouvelle-Aquitaine